Glengar GAA is a Gaelic Athletic Association club located in Glengar in County Tipperary, Ireland.

Achievements
 West Tipperary Senior Hurling Championship (1) 1957 (St. Nicholas -included Glengar, Cappa & Solohead),
 West Tipperary Minor A Hurling Championship (2) 1932 (as Hollyford/Glengar), 1942 (Sean Treacy's - included Hollyford)

References

External links
GAA Info Website
Tipperary GAA site

Gaelic games clubs in County Tipperary